Ogcodes pallipes  is a Palearctic species of  fly in the family Acroceridae.

References

External links
Diptera info
Images representing Ogcodes pallipes

Acroceridae
Insects described in 1812
Taxa named by Pierre André Latreille
Diptera of Europe